Pedinidae are a family of echinoderms.

References 

Pedinoida